John Hilton (19 April 1838 – 8 May 1910) was an English cricketer. Hilton's batting style is unknown. He was born at Mansfield, Nottinghamshire.

Hilton made a single first-class appearance for Nottinghamshire against Surrey in 1865 at Trent Bridge. He batted once in Nottinghamshire's nine wicket victory, opening the batting in their first-innings he scored 7 runs before he was dismissed by Tom Sewell. This was his only major appearance for Nottinghamshire.

He died at Stafford, Staffordshire on 8 May 1910. His father John Hilton senior also played first-class cricket.

References

External links
John Hilton at ESPNcricinfo
John Hilton at CricketArchive

1838 births
1910 deaths
Sportspeople from Mansfield
Cricketers from Nottinghamshire
English cricketers
Nottinghamshire cricketers